Karlo Lusavec (born 30 October 2003) is a Croatian footballer currently playing as a midfielder for NK Varaždin.

Career statistics

Club

Notes

References

2003 births
Living people
Sportspeople from Varaždin
Association football midfielders
Croatian footballers
NK Varaždin (2012) players
Croatian Football League players